Wheatland Township is a township in Dickinson County, Kansas, USA.  As of the 2000 census, its population was 152.

Wheatland Township was organized in 1878.

Geography
According to the USGS, it contains one cemetery, Fairview.

The streams of East Holland Creek and West Holland Creek run through this township.

Further reading

References

 USGS Geographic Names Information System (GNIS)

External links
 City-Data.com

Townships in Dickinson County, Kansas
Townships in Kansas